Cheyenne is an American Western television series which ran on ABC from 1955 to 1962. The show broadcast 108 black-and-white episodes.

Series overview

Episodes

Season 1 (1955–56)

Season 2 (1956–57)

Season 3 (1957–58)

Season 4 (1959–60)

Season 5 (1960–61)

Season 6 (1961–62)

In "A Man Called Ragan", the titular character of Cheyenne Bodie never appears. That episode was a pilot for The Dakotas (a spin-off of Cheyenne). It was presented as an episode of Cheyenne in 1962; The Dakotas would be on the air until 1963.

Season 7 (1962)

External links
 
 

Cheyenne
Lists of American Western (genre) television series episodes